Coufal (feminine: Coufalová) is a Czech surname. Notable people with the surname include:
 Birgit Coufal (born 1985), Austrian squash player 
 Petr Coufal (born 1995), Czech figure skater
 Scott Coufal (born 1974), American soccer goalkeeper
 Vladimír Coufal (born 1992), Czech football defender

See also
 

Czech-language surnames